Rich Brzeski (born May 26, 1978) is a former professional lacrosse player for the New York Titans and Philadelphia Wings in the National Lacrosse League

Brzeski played collegiate lacrosse at Rutgers University.  He was drafted by the Philadelphia Wings in the 2000 NLL Entry Draft.  Brzeski was acquired by the New York Titans prior to the 2007 NLL season in the 2006 NLL Expansion draft.

References

1978 births
Living people
American lacrosse players
Philadelphia Wings players
New York Titans (lacrosse) players
Rutgers Scarlet Knights men's lacrosse players